The 1933 Nevada Wolf Pack football team was an American football team that represented the University of Nevada in the Far Western Conference (FWC) during the 1933 college football season. In their second season under head coach Brick Mitchell, the Wolf Pack compiled a 4–4 record (3–0 against conference opponents), was outscored by opponents by a total of 144 to 60, and won the conference championship.

Schedule

References

Nevada
Nevada Wolf Pack football seasons
Northern California Athletic Conference football champion seasons
Nevada Wolf Pack football